Plithocyon is an extinct genus of hemicyonine bear of the Miocene epoch, endemic to North America and Europe.

Fossil distribution
Sites and age of some specimens:
Hemicyon Quarry, Barstow Formation, San Bernardino County, California ~13.7—11.6 Ma.
Ruby River Basin No.5, Madison County, Montana ~23—5.3 Ma.
Pasalar site, Bursa, Turkey ~16—13.7 Ma.
Pontigne site, France ~11.6—7.2 Ma.

Species
Plithocyon antunesi Ginsburg & Morales, 1998
Plithocyon armagnacensis Ginsburg, 1955
Plithocyon barstowensis Frick, 1926
Plithocyon bruneti Ginsburg, 1980
Plithocyon conquense Ginsberg
Plithocyon ursinus Cope, 1875

References

Ginsburg, L. & Morales, J. 1998. Les Hemicyoninae (Ursidae, Carnivora, Mammalia) et les formes apparentées du Miocène inférieur et moyen d'Europe occidentale. Ann. Paléontol. 84 (1): 71–123.

Hemicyonids
Miocene carnivorans
Tortonian extinctions
Miocene mammals of North America
Langhian first appearances
Fossil taxa described in 1955
Prehistoric carnivoran genera